Craig Johnson is an American screenwriter and film director.

Originally from Bellingham, Washington, he studied theatre at the University of Washington and worked for several years in theatre, in sketch comedy and as an educational presenter at the Pacific Science Center.

In 2002, he moved to New York City to study filmmaking at the Tisch School of the Arts. His thesis project for that program, True Adolescents, was released in 2009 as his first feature film. His second feature film, The Skeleton Twins, was released in 2014.

Johnson is openly gay. On May 23, 2015, he married television writer Adam Roberts, his boyfriend of 9 years, in Los Angeles.

Filmography
 True Adolescents (2009)
 The Skeleton Twins (2014)
 Wilson (2017)
 Alex Strangelove (2018)
 Special (2021), 4 episodes
 The Parenting (TBA)

References

External links

American male screenwriters
American gay writers
LGBT film directors
American LGBT screenwriters
LGBT people from Washington (state)
Writers from Bellingham, Washington
University of Washington School of Drama alumni
Tisch School of the Arts alumni
Living people
Film directors from Washington (state)
Year of birth missing (living people)